Llusk'a Qaqa (Quechua llusk'a polished; slippery qaqa rock, "polished (or slippery) rock", also spelled Llusca Kaka) is a mountain in the Bolivian Andes which reaches a height of approximately . It is located in the Chuquisaca Department, Jaime Zudáñez Province, Icla Municipality. Llusk'a Qaqa lies southwest of Wisk'achayuq and southeast of P'isaqayuq. The Sankha Wayq'u flows along its southern slope.

References 

Mountains of Chuquisaca Department